Reserve Square is a two-building skyscraper mixed use apartment complex in downtown Cleveland, Ohio, United States. Both buildings have 23 floors and are 266 feet (81 m) high. The Square is directly west of the senior residential Cuyahoga Metropolitan Housing Authority's Bohn Towers.

The complex was originally called Park Centre and was an extension of the Erieview Plan. One of the goals of this plan was to create residential zones in downtown Cleveland, however, by the 1970s with completion of the Tower at Erieview, One Erieview Plaza and Reserve Square this was only partially achieved.

History
The West Tower was built in 1969 and the East Tower in 1973. It was designed by the Cleveland architectural firm Dalton-Dalton-Newport-Little, which at one time was one of the most prominent firms in the world, so much so that in 1984, Dalton was acquired by URS Corp of San Francisco. The exterior design was influenced by Le Corbusier's public housing development Unité d'Habitation, a building notable for its interiors and minimal footprint on the ground. The aesthetic approaches Brutalism with the way it utilizes raw cement features, though it is a bit less refined than that style. The West Tower contained an Embassy Suites Hotel for a number of years, until it closed in 2012 and was converted back to apartments.

Cleveland television stations WOIO and WUAB (which were both owned by Raycom Media of Montgomery, Alabama, which has since been acquired by Gray Television) have their broadcast studios on the building's first floor. They have been present in the tower since at least their switch to becoming the CBS affiliate in Cleveland in 1994.

The K & D Group of Willoughby, Ohio purchased the apartment tower for $36 million in August 2005, and purchased the hotel that December for $5.1 million.

See also
List of tallest buildings in Cleveland

References

External links

Reserve Square

Skyscraper hotels in Cleveland
Apartment buildings in Cleveland
Residential skyscrapers in Cleveland
Buildings and structures completed in 1969
Residential buildings completed in 1973
Hilton Hotels & Resorts hotels
Downtown Cleveland
1969 establishments in Ohio